Maurienne is one of the provinces of Savoy, corresponding to the arrondissement of Saint-Jean-de-Maurienne in France. It is also the original name of the capital of the province, now Saint-Jean-de-Maurienne.

Location

The Maurienne valley is one of the great transverse valleys of the Alps. The river which has shaped the valley since the last glaciation is the Arc. The valley begins at the village of Écot (in the commune of Bonneval-sur-Arc), at the foot of the Col de l'Iseran, and ends at the confluence of the Arc and the Isère in the commune of Aiton.  The mountains on the southern side are the Dauphiné Alps and the Cottian Alps. On the northern side are the part of the Graian Alps known as the Vanoise. The capital, Saint-Jean-de-Maurienne, lies at the confluence of the Arc and the Arvan.

Roads and railways
Part of the main road and rail route between Lyon and Turin runs through the valley.  The A43 autoroute and a railway line enter at the western end from the Isère valley, and leave at Modane using the Fréjus Road and Rail Tunnels respectively which both emerge at Bardonecchia in Italy. The Turin–Lyon high-speed railway will also be built through the lower valley.

The other roads out of the valley use the following mountain cols:
 The Col de l'Iseran toward the Tarentaise Valley
 The Col du Mont-Cenis toward Italy
 The Col du Télégraphe and the Col du Galibier toward the Col du Lautaret which gives access in turn (in different directions) towards Grenoble or Briançon
 The Col de la Croix-de-Fer and the Col du Glandon toward Grenoble
 The Col de la Madeleine toward the Tarentaise
 The Col du Grand Cucheron towards  the Isère valley 
Other cols such as the Col d'Etache, Col du Carro and the Col de Vallée Etroite are only passable on foot.

Districts
The province contains the following cantons:
 canton d'Aiguebelle
 canton de La Chambre
 canton de Lanslebourg-Mont-Cenis
 canton de Modane
 canton de Saint-Jean-de-Maurienne
 canton de Saint-Michel-de-Maurienne

Economy

The abundance of hydro-electric power (there are twenty-four hydroelectric stations in the valley) created heavy industry such as electrochemical plants and aluminum refining, but now the emphasis in the area is on tourism, especially winter sports.  Numerous ski resorts line the valley, from the small villages like Albiez-Montrond to the purpose-built resorts, dating from the 1970s like Le Corbier and Les Karellis.

The Vanoise National Park and its protected surroundings are a major tourist attraction. Alpine ibex, grey wolves, lynx, royal eagles or vultures are among the many rare species that live in the numerous valleys of Maurienne.

The famous but rare and expensive Bleu de Termignon cheese is made in the commune of Termignon in the Haute-Maurienne near the Italian border.

History

The region has numerous traces of human habitation since the Paleolithic.  In 1032, Humbert the White-Handed received the Maurienne, his native land, from Conrad II the Salian whom he had helped in his Italian campaigns against Aribert, Archbishop of Milan. The House of Savoy maintained their independence as counts  and then dukes until Savoy was linked with the Kingdom of Sardinia, which included Piedmont in north-western Italy. In the Maurienne are a series of five forts, La Barrière de l'Esseillon, that were created by the Sardinians in the early 19th century to protect Piedmont from a French invasion. The Maurienne was not incorporated into France until 1860, as part of the political agreement with Napoleon III that brought about the unification of Italy. Despite this, the Maurienne and the Tarentaise valleys are classified as French towns and lands of Art and History.

The Basse-Maurienne
The lower part of the valley is industrial, and its three significant towns are:
 Saint-Jean-de-Maurienne
 Saint-Michel-de-Maurienne
 Aiguebelle

The Haute-Maurienne

The upper valley of the Arc is known as the Haute-Maurienne. It lies along the Italian border around 45 km near Mont Cenis. The principal town is Modane, an old frontier town, at the mouth of the Fréjus Road Tunnel and dominated by the resort of Val Fréjus. The other villages, rising up from the valley, are:

le Bourget
Avrieux
Villarodin
Aussois (ski resort)
Bramans (authentic town)
Sollières-Sardières (has a useful small airstrip)
Termignon
Lanslebourg-Mont-Cenis, Lanslevillard (the two villages form the resort Val Cenis)
Bessans (popular area for cross-country skiing and international biathlon stadium, unique in France)
Bonneval-sur-Arc (area for Alpine skiing)

About 5,000 inhabitants live there permanently, but the population reaches about 15,000 in the winter.

Much of the Haute-Maurienne is included in Vanoise National Park, which became the first national park in France in 1973.  This borders Gran Paradiso National Park of Italy. The two parks are important areas for ibexes, chamois, and golden eagles; the lammergeier was recently reintroduced into the area. It appears that wolves have reached the region within the past five years.

Skiing and snowboarding

The Maurienne valley is home to around 20 ski resorts. There is also access to The Three Valleys via the Orelle gondola.

Alpine/downhill

In rough order heading up the valley:
 Saint-François-Longchamp (linked to Valmorel)
 Les Sybelles comprising Le Corbier, La Toussuire, Saint-Jean-d'Arves, Saint-Sorlin-d'Arves, Les Bottières, Saint-Colomban-des-Villards
 Albiez-Montrond
 Les Karellis
 Valloire and Valmeinier
 Orelle, where the gondola gives access to the Plan Bouchet skiing area, and hence Val Thorens and the "Three Valleys"
 Valfréjus
 La Norma
 Aussois
 Bramans
 Termignon
 Val Cenis
 Bonneval-sur-Arc

Cross country
 Bessans
 Sollières-Sardières

External links
 www.maurienne.fr, official portal site for the area 
 The tourism portal for Maurienne
 Map of the Maurienne Valley Ski Resorts
 Savoie Patrimoine - Foundation for the international cultural action in the mountains 
 Official site for Val Cenis
 Discover the Savoie-Maurienne with the Latitude-Gallimard internet series

Landforms of Savoie
Valleys of France
Valleys of the Alps
Landforms of Auvergne-Rhône-Alpes